Quito Glacier is a glacier draining the northeast slopes of Mount Plymouth and flowing northeastwards into the sea west of Canto Point in north Greenwich Island, South Shetland Islands. It was named after the capital of Ecuador, c. 1990, by the Ecuadorian Antarctic Expedition.

See also
 List of glaciers in the Antarctic
 Glaciology

Maps
 L.L. Ivanov et al. Antarctica: Livingston Island and Greenwich Island, South Shetland Islands. Scale 1:100000 topographic map. Sofia: Antarctic Place-names Commission of Bulgaria, 2005.
 L.L. Ivanov. Antarctica: Livingston Island and Greenwich, Robert, Snow and Smith Islands. Scale 1:120000 topographic map.  Troyan: Manfred Wörner Foundation, 2009.

References

External links
 SCAR Composite Antarctic Gazetteer.

Glaciers of Greenwich Island